Ašanja is a village in Serbia. It is situated in the Pećinci municipality, in the Srem District, Vojvodina Province. The village has a Serb ethnic majority, with a population of 1,365 people (2011 census).

See also
List of places in Serbia
List of cities, towns and villages in Vojvodina

References 

Populated places in Syrmia
Populated places in Srem District
Pećinci